The North American Trials Council Championship is the official US National Trials Championship and has been held since 1974.

History
In 1974 The NATC joined forces with the AMA and put together a nine-round series as the US National Trials Championship. Lane Leavitt showed his class by winning five of the eight rounds he competed in. In second place was up and coming star Marland Whaley on the Montesa with early series leader Don Sweet bringing his Yamaha home in third.

Factory Honda rider Marland Whaley stomped all over the championship in 1977 taking eight wins from eight starts, leaving the rest to fight it out for second spot. That battle was won by Bernie Schreiber who tied with Don Sweet for second but took the nod on highest place finishes throughout the season.

The 1978 Championship was a three way battle between defending champion Marland Whaley, 1974 Champion Lane Leavitt and Bernie Schreiber who was splitting his time between the nationals and the FIM Trial World Championship for the first time. Schreiber took the title after taking a win at the final round in Alabama, giving him four wins and a third for the season and a points total of 70. Leavitt was one point behind on 69 points taking three wins, and Whaley a close third behind the Bultaco riders on his Montesa.

NATC Trials Champions

See also 
 Trial des Nations
 Scott Trial
 FIM Trial World Championship
 FIM Trial European Championship

References

External links

Motorcycle trials
World motorcycle racing series